Dwight Bradley was an American football and basketball coach.  He served as the head football coach at Buchtel College—now known as the University of Akron—for one season in 1908, compiling a record of 3–4.  Bradley also coached the men's basketball team at Buchtel for one game that year, tallying a mark of 1–0.  Walter East coached the basketball squad for the remainder of that season.  Bradley was a graduate of the University of Pennsylvania.

Head coaching record

Football

Basketball

Notes

References

Year of birth missing
Year of death missing
Akron Zips football coaches
Akron Zips men's basketball coaches
University of Pennsylvania alumni